Flavours is the thirteenth studio album by the Canadian rock band The Guess Who. This was the first album by the group to feature Domenic Troiano on guitar.

Release history
In addition to the usual 2 channel stereo version the album was also released by RCA in a 4 channel quadraphonic version on both LP and 8-track tape. The quad LP version was released using the Quadradisc system.

The album was first released on CD in a "Two-Fer" series, bundled with the album Rockin', although this release was criticized by multiple reviewers for poor sound quality.  In 2011, the album was released in remastered form by the Iconoclassic label including previously unreleased demo tracks.

Track listing
All songs written by Burton Cummings and Domenic Troiano.
"Dancin' Fool" – 3:34
"Hoe Down Time" – 3:52
"Nobody Knows His Name" – 3:19
"Diggin' Yourself" – 3:42
"Seems Like I Can't Live with You, But I Can't Live Without You" – 5:28
"Dirty" – 5:30
"Eye" – 3:57
"Loves Me Like a Brother" – 3:26
"Long Gone" – 7:59

2011 Iconoclassic remaster bonus tracks:
10. "A Fool, a Fool, I Met a Fool" (Demo) – 4:09
11. "Save a Smile" (Demo) – 2:58
12. "Roll with the Punches" (Demo) – 4:49
13. "Your Back Yard" (Demo) – 4:04

Personnel
Burton Cummings – lead vocals, keyboards
Domenic Troiano – guitar, mandolin (Track 5), backing vocals
Bill Wallace – bass, backing vocals
Garry Peterson – drums
Jack Richardson – producer
Brian Christian – engineer

Charts
Album

Singles

References

1975 albums
The Guess Who albums
Albums produced by Jack Richardson (record producer)
RCA Victor albums